The Butte Mountains are a mountain range in White Pine County, Nevada;  which is on the north of the White River Valley.

References 

Mountain ranges of White Pine County, Nevada
Mountain ranges of Nevada